Casey Howe (born 2 September 2002) is a Northern Irish association footballer who plays as a centre forward for Women's Premiership club Glentoran and the Northern Ireland women's national team. She previously played for Linfield Ladies FC.

References

2002 births
Living people
Women's association football forwards
Women's association footballers from Northern Ireland
Northern Ireland women's international footballers
Linfield Ladies F.C. players
Women's Premiership (Northern Ireland) players